Prasat Bakong District is a district located in Siem Reap Province, in north-west Cambodia. According to the 1998 census of Cambodia, it had a population of 54,129.

See also 
 Roluos (temples) - the three early Angkor temples known as the "Roluos group" are located to the north-west of the village of this name (not to be confused with Roluos, in the Svay Chek District, Banteay Meanchey Province), in the western part of the district and 13 km east of the provincial capital of Siem Reap.

Administrative divisions

References 

Districts of Cambodia
Geography of Siem Reap province